Sylvio Pirillo (or Sílvio Pirillo) (27 July 1916 in Porto Alegre – 22 April 1991 in Porto Alegre) was a Brazilian football striker.

Pirillo's first professional club was Sport Club Americano. His good performances granted him moves to Internacional and then Peñarol. In 1941 he transferred to Flamengo with the hard task to replace Leonidas da Silva—who had been 1940 Rio State Championship's top scorer with 30 goals.

Pirillo became an idol when by the end of 1941 Rio State Championship he had been its top scorer with 39 goals—an unbeaten record until today. He was also a very important player at 1942-1943-1944 Rio State Championships titles. Pirillo is the 4th high scorer in Flamengo's history with 204 goals.

In 1948 he signed with Botafogo and once again he had a difficult assignment: to replace Heleno de Freitas. In the same year he won the Rio State Championship with Botafogo, becoming an idol in another major club.

After retiring as a player, Pirillo began a successful career as a coach. As Brazil's coach, he was the first one to draft Pelé in 1957, for the Roca Cup, a match against Argentina, at Maracanã Stadium.

Honours
Rio State Championship
 1942, 1943, 1944 - Flamengo
 1948 - Botafogo

References

External links
Profile at cbf.com.br

1916 births
1991 deaths
Footballers from Porto Alegre
Brazilian footballers
Expatriate footballers in Uruguay
Brazilian football managers
Sport Club Internacional players
Peñarol players
CR Flamengo footballers
Botafogo de Futebol e Regatas players
Botafogo de Futebol e Regatas managers
Bonsucesso Futebol Clube managers
Clube Náutico Capibaribe managers
Fluminense FC managers
Brazil national football team managers
Sport Club Internacional managers
Sport Club Corinthians Paulista managers
Sociedade Esportiva Palmeiras managers
Clube Atlético Juventus managers
São Paulo FC managers
Esporte Clube Bahia managers
Desportiva Ferroviária managers
Paysandu Sport Club managers
Esporte Clube Santo André managers
Rio Claro Futebol Clube managers
Association football forwards
Club Guaraní managers